Saygın Soysal (born 21 May 1982) is a Turkish actor.

Life and career 
Soysal was born on 21 May 1982 in Ankara as the only child of his family. His father is from Çaykara and his mother is from Ilgaz. At the age of two, he moved with his family to Bursa. They later settled in Trabzon, where he finished his high school. Soysal is a graduate of Hacettepe University State Conservatory with a degree in performing arts. He made his television debut in 2005 with a role in the series Kırık Kanatlar, portraying the character of Çavuş Yunus. In 2006, he joined the cast of Hatırla Sevgili, portraying Recep Tayyip Erdoğan. He further rose to prominence in 2013 with his role in the historical drama series Muhteşem Yüzyıl. In 2014, he starred in Kara Para Aşk along with Tuba Büyüküstün and Engin Akyürek. In 2017, he briefly appeared in Payitaht: Abdülhamid before being cast in a recurring role in Çukur. He was a regular on the Netflix original series Hakan: Muhafız, and starred in the TV series Maraşlı in 2021.

Filmography

TV series

Film

References

External links 

1982 births
Living people
Turkish male television actors
Turkish male film actors
Hacettepe University Ankara State Conservatory alumni